This is a list of the complete squads for the 2019 Six Nations Championship, an annual rugby union tournament contested by the national rugby teams of England, France, Ireland, Italy, Scotland and Wales. Ireland were the defending champions.

Note: Number of caps and players' ages are indicated as of 1 February 2019 – the tournament's opening day. For players added to a squad during the tournament, their caps and age are indicated as of the date of their call-up.

England
On 17 January, England named a 35-man squad ahead of the 2019 Six Nations Championship.

Head coach:  Eddie Jones

Call-ups
On 5 February, Nick Isiekwe was called up to the squad.

On 4 March, Chris Robshaw and Jonathan Joseph were announced in the squad.

France
On 9 January, Brunel named a 31-man squad ahead of the 2019 Six Nations.

Head coach:  Jacques Brunel

Call-ups
On 22 January, Bernard Le Roux pulled out of the squad due to injury, and was replaced by Fabien Sanconnie.

On 5 February, Julien Marchand pulled out of the squad due to injury, and was replaced by Camille Chat.

On 16 February, Dany Priso was ruled out of the squad due to injury, and was replaced by Etienne Falgoux.

On 11 March, Dany Priso and Kélian Galletier were called up to replace the injured Jefferson Poirot and Wenceslas Lauret.

Ireland
On 16 January, Joe Schmidt announced a 38-man squad for the 2019 Six Nations.

Head coach:  Joe Schmidt

Call-ups
On 21 January, Tadhg Beirne was ruled out of the first two rounds of the competition, and Quinn Roux was called up in his place.

Italy
On 10 January, Conor O'Shea named a 31-man squad for Italy's 2019 Six Nations Championship.

Head coach:  Conor O'Shea

Call-ups
On 16 January, Marco Fuser and Marco Zanon were added to the squad.

On 30 January, Nicola Quaglio was added to the squad.

On 4 February, Engjel Makelara and Edoardo Gori were added to the squad.

On 21 February, Marco Riccioni was called up to the squad 

On 27 February, Oliviero Fabiani and Jake Polledri were added to the squad.

Scotland
On 16 January, Gregor Townsend named a 39-man squad for the 2019 Six Nations Championship.

Head coach:  Gregor Townsend

Call-ups
On 21 January, Luke Crosbie, Alex Dunbar, Rob Harley and Matt Smith being called into the squad as injury cover.

On 28 January, Rory Hughes, Stafford McDowall and Henry Pyrgos being called into the squad as injury cover.

On 4 February, Fraser Brown and Murray McCallum called into the squad as replacements.

On 18 February, Duncan Weir, Dougie Fife, James Johnstone, Magnus Bradbury, Zander Fagerson and George Turner were called up to the squad.

On 4 March,  Matt Fagerson, Byron McGuigan and Gordon Reid were called up to the squad.

On 11 March, Ruaridh Jackson and Kyle Steyn were called up to the squad as injury cover.

Wales
On 15 January, Warren Gatland named a 39-man squad for the 2019 Six Nations Championship.

Head coach:  Warren Gatland

References

squads
2019 Squads